Stephan Koltzk (born 15 January 1978 in Frankfurt (Oder)) is a German rower. He finished fourth in the eight at the 2004 Summer Olympics.

References 
 
 

1978 births
Living people
Sportspeople from Frankfurt (Oder)
Olympic rowers of Germany
Rowers at the 2004 Summer Olympics
German male rowers

World Rowing Championships medalists for Germany